The Court of Session Act 1813 was an Act of the Parliament of the United Kingdom (citation 53 Geo III c. 64) which reformed Scotland's highest court, the Court of Session. The Act continued reforms to the Court of Session begun by the Court of Session Act 1808 and the Court of Session Act 1810, creating the divisions known as the Inner House and the Outer House.

It was repealed by the Court of Session Act 1988

References

1813 in British law
Court of Session
Acts of the Parliament of the United Kingdom concerning Scotland
United Kingdom Acts of Parliament 1813
1813 in Scotland
Repealed United Kingdom Acts of Parliament